Saitbaba (Säyetbaba) is a rural locality (a selo) and the administrative centre of Saitbabinsky Selsoviet, Gafuriysky District, Bashkortostan, Russia. The population was 1,452 as of 2010. There are 21 streets.

Geography 
Saitbaba is located 36 km northeast of Krasnousolsky (the district's administrative centre) by road. Tugay is the nearest rural locality.

References 

Rural localities in Gafuriysky District